The  Anjouan sparrowhawk (Accipiter francesiae pusillus), also known as the Anjouan Island sparrowhawk, Ndzuwani goshawk or Joanna Island goshawk, is a subspecies of Frances's sparrowhawk (Accipiter francesiae). It is endemic to the Comoros island of Anjouan. It was thought to be extinct until searches in the 1980s and in 2005 confirmed that it is still extant.

Description
Both sexes of the Anjouan sparrowhawk resemble the male of the nominate race of Frances's sparrowhawk from Madagascar, but are markedly smaller and lack most of the barring on the underside. Both sexes have white underparts, grey upperparts, dark-greyish wings, and dark barring on the tail.

Status
Due to extensive hunting and habitat loss during the 20th century, the Anjouan sparrowhawk became extremely rare by the late 1950s. Only one individual was found in a month-long survey in 1958 and the population was estimated at between one and ten birds. Another expedition in 1965 spent 3 days on Ndzuwani without encountering the bird (although no dedicated effort was made, and the sparrowhawk's key habitat was not visited); the authors remarked that other subspecies were "extremely tame".

In the period until 1907, 44 specimens were taken, one of which is on display in the Zoological Museum of the University of Zurich, Switzerland. The last population lived in the mountainous central uplands, but between 1958 and 1977, no sightings were made.

Other subspecies of Frances's sparrowhawk on other islands in the Comoros have not suffered the same losses. One possible cause is the deforestation caused by human population growth; A. f. griveaudii has declined recently on Grande Comore, coinciding with a significant increase in the human population, while A. f. brutus is still common on Mayotte where extensive lowland forest remains, and human population density is around 75% of that on Ndzuwani.

One individual is seen in the BBC series "Unknown Africa Episode 1: The Comoros" when the film crew is taken to a remnant rain forest patch on Anjouan by the director of Action Comores in search of Livingstone's flying fox.

References

Accipiter
Birds of the Comoros
Birds described in 1875
Taxa named by John Henry Gurney Sr.